Tabivere is a small borough in Tartu Parish, Tartu County, Estonia. As of 2011 Census, the settlement's population was 971.

References

Boroughs and small boroughs in Estonia
Populated places in Tartu County
Tartu Parish